Olafsenia is a genus of mites in the family Acaridae.

Species
 Olafsenia trifolium (Oudemans, 1901)

References

Acaridae